Atmore Municipal Airport  is a city-owned public-use airport located  east of the central business district of Atmore, a city in Escambia County, Alabama, United States. According to the FAA's National Plan of Integrated Airport Systems for 2009–2013, it is categorized as a general aviation facility.

Facilities and aircraft 
For the 12-month period ending February 26, 2007, the airport had 3,870 general aviation aircraft operations. In 2017, the city of Atmore extended the runway length to its current length of 5,209 feet from its previous length of 4,950 feet.

References

External links 
 Coastal Gateway Regional Economic Development Alliance
 Escambia County Industrial Development Authority
 

Airports in Alabama
Transportation buildings and structures in Escambia County, Alabama